Natascha Alexandra Brandt Rodríguez is a pageant titleholder, born in Caracas, Venezuela on May 13, 1989. She was the official winner of the Señorita Deporte Venezuela 2006 (Miss Sports Venezuela) pageant held in  Caracas, Venezuela on August 8, 2006. Brandt represented the Nueva Esparta state in the Miss Venezuela 2008 pageant, on September 10, 2008. Many people in the country says she is expected to become an international top model

References

External links
Miss Venezuela Official Website
Miss Venezuela La Nueva Era MB

1989 births
Living people
People from Caracas
Venezuelan female models